Boss is a lunar impact crater that is located along the northeast rim of the Moon's near side. Due to its location, the crater is viewed from the side by observers on the Earth, and its visibility is subject to libration effects.

This formation has not been significantly eroded by impacts, and it retains a well-defined outer rim that is not overlain by smaller craters of note. The inner wall is wide and has a terraced surface. The interior floor has a low central peak that is offset slightly to the north from the midpoint.

The closest named craters are Vashakidze to the southeast on the far side of the Moon, and the heavily eroded Riemann to the south. Further to the southwest is the prominent crater Gauss, and to the north-northwest is the Mare Humboldtianum.

The crater is named for astronomer Lewis Boss.

Satellite craters 

By convention these features are identified on lunar maps by placing the letter on the side of the crater midpoint that is closest to Boss.

References

Further reading 

 
 
 
 
 
 
 
 
 
 
 
 

Impact craters on the Moon